In physics, atomic coherence is the induced coherence between levels of a multi-level atomic system sometimes observed when it interacts with a coherent electromagnetic field.

If a coherent, narrow bandwidth laser is applied to a two-level system, the wave function will undergo Rabi flopping (Rabi oscillation) between the ground and excited states. At some point in time the system will undergo spontaneous decay and its wave function will collapse to the ground-state wave function. From there on, a new Rabi oscillation will start until the next spontaneous decay. Each spontaneous decay essentially changes the phase of the Rabi oscillation. If instead of single two-level system there is a large collection of identical two-level systems (like a lot of the same species atoms), then all of them will begin Rabi oscillation at the same time, and therefore all of them will be in phase with each other. But due to the spontaneous decay different atoms will collapse to their ground-state at different (and random) times and start a new Rabi oscillation. For this reason fewer and fewer atoms will be in-phase as time passes by. This is called decoherence (meaning individual systems, e.g. atoms, are no longer coherent with each other).

Atomic coherence can involve more than two levels and its preparation more than a single laser.

An atomic coherence is essential in research on several effects, such as electromagnetically induced transparency (EIT), lasing without inversion (LWI), enhanced dispersion without absorption, Stimulated raman adiabatic passage (STIRAP) and nonlinear optical interaction with enhanced efficiency. Atomic coherence is useful to produce super radiant laser which has an extremely narrow linewidth.

See also
Rabi cycle

Atomic, molecular, and optical physics
Photonics

References